Nassim Oudahmane (born January 24, 1987 in Tizi Ouzou, Algeria) is a professional footballer who played as a defender for JS Kabylie in the Algerian league.

Honours
 Won the Algerian League once with JS Kabylie in 2008

External links
 JS Kabylie Profile
 DZFoot Profile

Living people
1987 births
Kabyle people
Algerian footballers
Footballers from Tizi Ouzou
Association football defenders
JS Kabylie players
21st-century Algerian people